Panayiotis Loizides is a Cypriot businessman. He has been the secretary-general of the Cyprus Chamber of Commerce since 1975, and is the chairman of RCB Bank.

References

Living people
Cypriot businesspeople
Greek Cypriot people
Year of birth missing (living people)